The Maghreb Association of North America (MANA), also called Assembly of the Maghreb is a North African-American organization Chicago-based whose goal is to help new immigrants from Maghreb (North Africa) to adapt to American life and maintain, in turn, the principles of Sunni Islam. The organization was founded by Moroccan and Algerian immigrants  in 1989  and meets to Moroccans, Algerians, Libyans and Tunisian people living in Chicago area. The Assembly connected to Maghrebis people of different economic conditions.

Because most North African immigrants in Chicago have not been associated closely with the Muslim Middle East, the North Africans come together as a common community. Often, in relation to the area of the mosque, the organization has taught job skills, English language,  the importance of Sirat al-Mustaqim and moderation, among other things. Have been trained women to balance paid work with traditional household chores. In addition, the Assembly meeting new people arriving at O'Hare airport, and deliver them employment, housing, and schools, and teach them to use and manage the computer. Immigrants also have a mosque at the corner of Elston and Montrose Avenue. Also religious activities such as collective prayer and the feasts of Ramadan have an important role in the assembly.

See also 
 North Africans in the United States

References

External links 
 Camp 2011 Maghreb Association of North America
  Maghreb-American Health Foundation

Algerian-American history
Berber-American culture
Libyan American
Moroccan-American history
North African American culture
Tunisian American